Guairim of Inisbofin was chief of Inishbofin, Galway.

Biography

Little is known of Guairim. He is said to have been a contemporary of Colmán of Lindisfarne who founded a monastery on the island in 665. A site adjacent to the harbour on some old maps was called 'Guairim's Castle'; the presbytery is now located there. Another site, listed on the Ordnance Survey maps as Áit Tigh Ghuairim was located in the townland of Bunamullen. Stones from it were taken to build the parochial house.

Guairim is supposed to have murdered six of Colmán's monks at Clossy Road, "over a question of tithes."

Traditional lore, used to tell of blood flowing from the earth at this site. Guairim was taken to Renvyle and tried, then chained to a rock at low tide and left to drown.

See also

 Seven Sisters of Renvyle
 Ceannanach

References

 Colmán's Cemetery:A History of Christianity, the Church and the Monastery on Inisbofin since 665 A.D., Maire Coyne, 2007. 

People from County Galway
7th-century Irish monarchs